Splash Amarillo Waterpark was a family-friendly waterpark located in Amarillo, Texas. It was originally built as FireWater Waterpark in May 2000. It sat on a  site just half a mile down Interstate 40 from the Big Texan Steak Ranch. It also features a gift shop, concession stand, volleyball courts, and an arcade. It closed in 2016, and all the slides will be relocated to a new park in Plainview called Royal Splash Texas, which will open in 2017.

History

Construction
Groundbreaking for the formerly named FireWater Waterpark began on May 7, 1999. It was constructed at a cost of $3.7 million on a  site, but it itself would only cover  of the complex. Missouri Valley Inc. of Amarillo was the general contractor of the project. The construction was completed well before the set opening date of May 6, 2000.

Bankruptcy
FireWater Waterpark came under scrutiny in 2002 after it failed to repay loans taken during the original construction of the park. While park president Gary Abramson claimed to be in the process of securing long-term financial backing for it, Satana Corporation sued it for $2.16 million. The suit claimed it signed a promissory note and that investors even ignored written payment demands sent directly to them. Eventually, it was forced into bankruptcy after Missouri Valley Inc. filed a bankruptcy petition. It was reopened in May 2003 under completely new management and ownership and renamed Splash Amarillo.

Fire
In July 2009, the park experienced a fire inside a building which houses lockers, dressing rooms, restrooms, a concession stand, and maintenance room. Over 200 park patrons were forced to evacuate after witnesses reported a water heater had caught on fire. The fire caused over $70,000 in damage after spreading from the first floor to the attic. Park president Paul Johnson claimed that the building was not insured. As of June 2011, it has been refurbished and is functioning again.

See also
 List of water parks

References

External links
Splash Amarillo

Defunct amusement parks in Texas
Water parks in Texas
Culture of Amarillo, Texas
Tourist attractions in Amarillo, Texas
Buildings and structures in Amarillo, Texas
2000 establishments in Texas